Delhi Daredevils (DD) are a franchise cricket team based in Delhi, India, which plays in the Indian Premier League (IPL). They were one of the ten teams that competed in the 2011 Indian Premier League. They were captained by Virender Sehwag. Delhi Daredevils finished tenth in the IPL and did not qualify for the Champions League T20.

Indian Premier League

Standings
Delhi Daredevils finished last in the league stage of IPL 2011.

Match log

Statistics

References

2011 Indian Premier League
Delhi Capitals seasons